Key is a Japanese visual novel video game development studio and brand under the publisher Visual Arts. The video games developed by Key are initially published by Visual Arts and released for Windows; consumer ports are published by Interchannel and Prototype. Key released their debut title, Kanon, in 1999, followed by their second title, Air, in 2000. Both Kanon and Air were initially released as adult games, but Key released their third game, Clannad, in 2004 with a rating of approval for all ages. Key's fourth game, Planetarian: The Reverie of a Little Planet, was also released in 2004 with a rating for all ages, and is described as a "kinetic novel" by the development team because of its completely linear storyline.

Key's fifth game, Tomoyo After: It's a Wonderful Life, was released in 2005 as an adult game and spin-off from Clannad; it expanded on the scenario of the heroine Tomoyo Sakagami. Key released their sixth visual novel, Little Busters!, in 2007 with a rating for all ages. Key's seventh title, Little Busters! Ecstasy, was an expanded, adult version of Little Busters! released in 2008. Key's eighth game, Kud Wafter, was released in 2010 as an adult game and spin-off from Little Busters! Ecstasy; it expanded on the scenario of the heroine Kudryavka Noumi. Key released their ninth game Rewrite in 2011 with a rating for all ages. Key released a fan disc of Rewrite titled Rewrite Harvest festa! in 2012.

Key's 11th game Angel Beats! 1st Beat was released in 2015. Key released the kinetic novel Harmonia in 2016. Key's 13th game Summer Pockets was released in 2018, and an expanded version titled Summer Pockets Reflection Blue was released in 2020. Three kinetic novels were released in 2021: Loopers, Planetarian: Snow Globe and Lunaria: Virtualized Moonchild. Another kinetic novel, Stella of The End, followed in 2022. A four-volume kinetic novel series for the Prima Doll multimedia project will be released between 2023 and 2024.

As of September 2022, 62 versions of Key's 18 released visual novels have been published by VisualArt's. Of the 62, 11 were released with an adult rating, and the remaining 51 had a rating for all ages. VisualArt's has ceased manufacturing 40 versions of Key's 18 games. Key released a box set called "Key 10th Memorial Box" in July 2009 containing six of Key's visual novels with a rating for all ages. The availability of Key 10th Memorial Box was restricted to ordering online. Key released "memorial editions" of their first five games in April and May 2010 with ratings for all ages.

Visual novel list

Windows

Consumer ports

Notes

References

 
Key